Déjeuner sur l'herbe (Lunch on the lawn) is the first album by Québécois rock band Les Breastfeeders. The album was released 4 May 2004 by Blow The Fuse Records.

Track listing
 Mini Jupe et Watusi
 J'pourrais pas vivre avec toi
 Laisse autant le vent tout emporter
 Angle mort
 Hé-Hé
 Amoureux Solitaires
 Ostrogoth-à-Gogo
 L'existence précède la diésel
 Y a rien à faire
 Ça ira
 Vanille ou fraise dans la steppe
 Misérats
 Concerto pour rien du tout

References 

2004 albums
Les Breastfeeders albums
Blow The Fuse Records albums